Aurélie Soubiran, Princess Ghika (27 March 1820 – 21 March 1904) was a French writer. She married a member of the Ghica family, princes of Wallachia, and wrote about her impressions of that country. She also wrote novels and essays.

Life

Aurélie de Soubiran was born on 27 March 1820 in Lectoure, Gers.
She was one of two daughters of Colonel Paul Emile Soubiran (1770–1855), who seems to have led an adventurous life.
Her sister Hédelmone Soubiran appeared in court in 1854 on charges of bigamy.
It was claimed she had married in England, then left her husband without a divorce and moved to Paris, where she married a hotel owner.

Aurélie de Soubiran became an essayist.
Her novel Virginia (1845) is about a street singer in Venice who defies convention.
She travels alone, wear men's clothes, smokes and lives with her lover, a young Roman.
A critic writing in the Bibliographie catholique affected shock that Aurélie de Soubiran dared put her name to a work that exalted immorality.

Aurélie married Grigore Ghika (1812 – 22 September 1858) on 23 November 1849 in Paris.
He was the fourth son of Prince Grigore IV Ghica, hospodar (ruler) of Wallachia.
Her husband had had an earlier liaison with Alexandrina Coressi, who gave him two children born in 1833 and 1837.
Her husband had emigrated to Paris in 1848 after participating in the Wallachian Revolution of 1848.

In 1850 Aurélie published La Valachie moderne (Modern Wallachia), based on a trip she had made to this country.
She sketched the appearance and customs of people, including the ordinary people and the lords isolated in their country homes.
Her account was generally positive, but did not gloss over problems.
A reviewer said, "... we regret that the author did not give more development to this sketch, which could have offered real interest; her style also leaves much to be desired; it lacks grace and naturalness; it is cut in little phrases that are somewhat affected and unattractive.
Her 1858 La Valachie devant l'Europe (Wallachia before Europe) was criticized for giving no more than a view of the social life of the wealthy, and avoiding all discussion of the very real political issues at the time.

She died on 21 March 1904.

Publications

.

Notes

Sources

1820 births
1904 deaths
Ghica family
French salon-holders
19th-century French women writers